Soyisile Pono (born 21 February 1994) is a South African first-class cricketer. He was included in Boland's squad for the 2016 Africa T20 Cup.

References

External links
 

1994 births
Living people
South African cricketers
Boland cricketers
Cricketers from Cape Town